"Generation of Love" is a song recorded by German band Masterboy. It was released in June 1995 and is taken from their album of the same name. The female vocals are performed by Trixi Delgado. The song is one of the band's most successful singles in terms of peak positions on the charts. It achieved success in many European countries, particularly in Finland, where it peaked at number 6 and in France, where it peaked at number 8 and stayed on the chart (top-50) for 13 weeks. The song was also a hit in Austria and in Belgium (Wallonia), where it remained ranked in the top-40 for 18 weeks. On the Eurochart Hot 100, "Generation of Love" reached number 35. In 2006, it was re-released in a remixed version with Freedom Williams and Linda Rocco in featuring, but was much less successful. This version is included on Masterboy's 2006 studio album US-Album. The artwork of the remixes used the same picture, but with different colours (red, blue, gray).

Music video
The music video for "Generation of Love" was directed by Jonathan Bate.

Track listings
 CD maxi
 "Generation of Love" (radio edit – ipanema mix) – 3:38
 "Generation of Love" (ipanema maxi version) – 5:51
 "Generation of Love" (radio edit – mondo mix) – 4:08
 "Generation of Love" (mondo maxi version) – 5:50

 CD maxi
 "Generation of Love" (ipanema maxi version) – 5:51
 "Generation of Love" (mondo maxi version) – 5:50
 "Masterboy mega mix" – 7:30
			
 CD maxi – Remixes
 "Generation of Love" (generated airplay mix) – 4:06
 "Generation of Love" (generated mix) – 7:29
 "Generation of Love" (robotnico acid house mix) – 5:01
 "Generation of Love" (fly away mix) – 6:02

 12" maxi
 "Generation of Love" (mondo maxi version) – 5:50  	
 "Generation of Love" (ipanema maxi version) – 5:51

 CD single
 "Generation of Love" (radio edit) – 3:40  	
 "Generation of Love" (ipanema maxi version) – 5:51

Credits
 Music : Zabler, Schleh and Obrecht
 Words : Zabler, Schleh and Skywalker
 Published by Session Musikverlag / Warner Chappell
 Produced by "Masterboy Beat Production" at Session Studios Walldorf
 Mixed by T. Engelhard and "Masterboy Beat Production"
 Mastered by J. Quincy Kramer, Polygram Hamburg
 Photography by Julia Maloof
 Designed by Goutte

Charts

Weekly charts

Year-end charts

References

1995 singles
Masterboy songs
1994 songs
Barclay (record label) singles
Music videos directed by Jonathan Bate